Geographical Society Island is an island off Foster Bay in northeastern Greenland.

Geography
The island has an area of 1,717 km2. It is mountainous with Svedenborg Fjeld as the highest point at 1,730 m. To the north lies the mouth of the Kaiser Franz Joseph Fjord with Ymer Island to the NW and smaller Bantekoe Island to the NE in Foster Bay. To the south lies Traill Island, separated by a narrow sound, the Vega Sound. In the west, over King Oscar Fjord lies Ella Island.

Geology
From west to east, the rocks constituting the island are sandstone of roughly Devonian, Carboniferous and Cretaceous age, and some smaller areas with Triassic and Jurassic sandstone.

See also
List of islands of Greenland

References

External links

Uninhabited islands of Greenland